Jan-Hendrik Wessels is a South African rugby union player for the  in the United Rugby Championship and  in the Currie Cup. His regular position is hooker.

Wessels was named in the  squad for the Super Rugby Unlocked competition.

Honours
 Currie Cup champion 2021

References

South African rugby union players
Living people
Rugby union props
Blue Bulls players
2001 births
Bulls (rugby union) players